Alphonse Aria (31 May 1902 - 17 February 1968) was a French wrestler. He competed in the Greco-Roman bantamweight event at the 1928 Summer Olympics.

References

External links
 

1902 births
1968 deaths
Olympic wrestlers of France
Wrestlers at the 1928 Summer Olympics
French male sport wrestlers
Sportspeople from Mulhouse